We, Students! is a 2022 Central African Republic documentary film written and directed by Rafiki Fariala on his feature film directorial debut. The film showcases the harsh realities on how students are brought up at the University of Bangui amid various pressing issues such as sexual harassment, terrible living conditions inside the campus and the reality of having to tolerate the rampant corrupted professors. The film captures and portrays the everyday lives of the filmmaker himself and his friends at the University of Bangui and they spare a thought about how their futures would eventually pan out in the Central African Republic in the future. The film was screened in the Panorama section at the 72nd Berlin International Film Festival and it became the first film ever from the Central African Republic to premiere at the Berlin International Film Festival. According to The Africa Report, it was ranked among top ten most notable African films of 2022.

Cast 

 Rafiki Fariala as himself
 Nestor Ngbandi Ngouyou
 Aaron Koyasoukpengo
 Benjamin Kongo Sombot
 Rafiki Fariala

References

External links 

 
 We, Students! at Berlinale

Central African films
2022 films
2022 documentary films
2022 directorial debut films
2020s French-language films